Engine Company 12 is a former fire station and a historic structure located in the Bloomingdale neighborhood and on North Capitol Street in Washington, D.C.  The engine company was established on July 1, 1897, with an 1884 Clapp & Jones 450 GPM steam fire engine and an 1887 E. B. Preston hose reel carriage.   The three-story brick building was designed by Washington architect Snowden Ashford in the Colonial Revival style.  It was listed on the National Register of Historic Places in 2007.

References

Fire stations completed in 1897
Defunct fire stations in Washington, D.C.
Fire stations on the National Register of Historic Places in Washington, D.C.
Colonial Revival architecture in Washington, D.C.